Aquamicrobium segne is a Gram-negative, aerobic bacteria from the genus Aquamicrobium which was isolated from a biofilter of an animal rendering plant in Germany.

References

External links
Type strain of Aquamicrobium segne at BacDive -  the Bacterial Diversity Metadatabase

Phyllobacteriaceae
Bacteria described in 2012